Agreement for the Country is a centrist political and electoral alliance in San Marino, formed to contest the 2012 general election. It is composed of:
Socialist Party (PS, social democratic), 
Union for the Republic (UPR, centrist and Christian leftist),
Sammarinese Moderates (conservative).

References

Political party alliances in San Marino